Photo archive, short for photographs archive or photographic archive, may refer to:

 any archive of stock photography
 any of various photograph collections, including
 Department of Image Collections, National Gallery of Art Library, Washington, DC
 Bettmann Archive, owned by Corbis
 Motion Picture and Television Photo Archive, in California
 Nationaal Archief, in The Hague, The Netherlands
 National Photographic Archive, in Dublin, Ireland
 New England Historic Photographs Archive, in Vermont
 Notman Photographic Archives, at the McCord Museum in Montreal, Canada
 Villa I Tatti, in Florence, Italy
 Rijksbureau voor Kunsthistorische Documentatie, in The Hague, The Netherlands
 Frick Art Reference Library Photoarchive, in New York, New York
 Kunsthistorisches Institut in Florenz, in Florence, Italy
 Associated Press archive
 Getty Images archive
 Flickr Commons, which hosts multiple archives
 George Eastman House
 Cameroon Press Photo Archive, in Buea, Cameroon

See also